The 1948–49 BAA season was the Bombers' 3rd season in the NBA/BAA.

Draft

Roster

Regular season

Season standings

Record vs. opponents

Game log

Playoffs

West Division Semifinals
(1) Rochester Royals vs. (4) St. Louis Bombers: Royals win series 2-0
Game 1 @ Rochester: Rochester 93, St. Louis 64
Game 2 @ St. Louis: Rochester 66, St. Louis 64

Last Playoff Meeting: This is the first meeting between the Royals and Bombers.

Awards and records
Johnny Logan, All-NBA Second Team

References

St. Louis Bombers (NBA) seasons
St. Louis